A weight training bench is a piece of exercise equipment used for weight training. Weight training benches may be of various designs: fixed horizontal, fixed inclined, fixed in a folded position, with one adjustable portion, with two or more adjustable portions, with racks to hold bars, etc.  In the limit, the definition of a bench blurs into that of combinations that mix a bench and associated equipment.

Benches are manufactured by many different vendors, in an array of qualities, features, and prices.

History of Weight Bench 
In the 1930s, athletes started practicing barbell lift laying on the wooden benches or boxes. The new version of the press let them keep their legs lower and feet in contact with the floor. This form of lifting isolated the chest and deltoids and helped to minimise the use of momentum to move the weight. In the 1950s, bench press stanchions were introduced, which are the uprights that hold the barbell over the bench, so that the lifter can do the lift without spotter’s help. In the same years, Bob Hoffman began marketing a 5-in-1 bench which would allow users to press at incline, flat, and decline degrees.

Alternatives
Though the weight bench seems to define weight training for modern audiences, benches are not strictly necessary for many, if not most, exercises that typically use them.  For example, seated presses may be done while standing. In recent years, many home fitness enthusiasts have begun incorporating a swiss ball into their workouts in place of a traditional bench, since it is both more space-efficient and requires engagement of the core abdominal muscles. This substitution is not without criticism, since it can be difficult to maintain form and balance when lifting more than one's own body weight.

Before the invention of the weight bench the common way to work the chest was to lie on the floor and do what was known as the floor or supine press.

Types of Weight Bench 
There are 6 different types of weight benches available.

Flat Bench 
These are the most common and most popular types of benches. These are the flat benches that don’t have any attachments. The main muscle being worked is the chest, and the secondary muscles being used are the triceps and the shoulders.

Adjustable Weight Bench 
An adjustable bench is flexible and allows you to do a whole lot of exercises by adjusting the bench as per need. It can lie flat, can be inclined or declined

Olympic Weight Bench 
Olympic benches are professional advance level benches that are wider and longer.

Olympic benches are not simple benches rather they have several additional equipment added to them such as squat rack, weight plates, rod, dumbbells and more. It is a complete workout machine that allows you to do some advance exercises such as squats, quad exercises, bench press and more.

Folding Weight Bench 
Not all the benches can be folded. If you are in need of a weight bench that can be folded and carried easily anywhere, you should go for a folding one. These benches are not feature-rich as they have to fold so these are either flat or adjustable benches.

Abdominal Bench 
It is a bench that is specifically made for performing ab exercises. The position of these benches can be either flat, incline or decline. These benches have foot rollers that are used to lock the feet thus protecting the exerciser.

Preacher Curl Bench 
It is a bench that’s made for doing preacher curls specifically. Which are mainly used to work the short head of your biceps.

References

Weight training equipment
Benches (furniture)